Ellis Island is a 1983 historical novel by Fred Mustard Stewart.

A year after its publication a miniseries was filmed in the United Kingdom, based on this book.

Plot
In 1907 Jacob Rubinstein, a Russian Jew, leaves his village after it is attacked by cossacks. He heads for Hamburg, Germany, hoping that he can sail to America. While in Hamburg, he meets an African American called Roscoe Haines, who, after seeing his talent for playing Ragtime, encourages Jacob to go and see a music publisher called Abe Shulman in New York.

When on the ship, Jacob meets an Italian from Sicily named Marco Santorelli. Marco had been the gardener for the English actress Maude Charteris. She wanted him to move to London with her but he refused as he wanted to go to America to make his fortune.

One night during the crossing large numbers of the steerage class passengers dance on the ship's deck and Jacob and Marco meet and dance with two Irish sisters called Bridget and Georgiana O'Donnell. Bridget had been on the staff at Wexford Hall, the Irish home of the British landowner Jamie Barrymore the Earl of Wexford. Bridget, using the pseudonym of Mary-Ann Flaherty, had seduced the earl and assisted the Fenians in kidnapping Wexford. The same night Jacob has a brief conversation with a Czech called Tom Banicek.

When the ship arrives in New York, Bridget is frustrated that while first and second class passengers just go straight to immigration, the steerage class passengers are all required to go through Ellis Island. Marco passes through with no problems, Jacob is treated for a gunshot wound that he had suffered during the trouble in his village. Bridget too is allowed in, but Georgiana is refused entry when she is diagnosed with trachoma an eye disease that can lead to blindness. Despite Bridget's criticism of the Ellis Island doctor Carl Travers, the decision is final, but the sisters' Uncle Casey, a powerful businessman, arranges for Georgiana to return to Ireland and then come back on another ship by second class as she wouldn't be checked that way.

Tom Banicek, who has a cousin in New York, meets him on Ellis Island and translates for him when recruiters for the Staunton Mining Company based in Virginia try to employ him. Despite his cousin telling him that he would be poorly paid, would live in company housing which he would have to vacate if he ever left and that he could be fired for even mentioning joining a union, Tom says that he doesn't have a lot of choices for employment and that the conditions would be better than in the Austro-Hungarian Army which was the reason he came to America because he wants to avoid conscription.

After two years of living in America, Marco has been working as a labourer and decides to borrow money off a loan shark, as he concludes that the only way to make real money is to be your own boss. After, he buys a horse and cart, being a delivery driver in direct competition with Casey O'Donnell, he crashes and destroys his cart. When he is unable to repay the loan shark, Marco is tortured. Desperate, Marco discovers that Maude Charteris is in New York performing a play. He goes to see her and she agrees to give him the money to buy a truck, clean clothes, and somewhere decent to live. In return, he is to become her lover, despite there being a large age difference between them. One day out on deliveries, Marco meets Georgiana, who has now gone blind. They start going on regular dates. Georgiana and Bridget's aunt however, disapproves and asks Casey to sort the issue, which he interprets as him using his influence to get Marco deported. After some counterfeit money is planted on his truck, Marco is taken to Ellis Island, to await a ship to take him back to Italy. A fellow inmate at the Ellis Island prison block tells Marco that he can help him escape. That night they break out and swim through New York Harbor. Marco stays in a hotel in New Jersey and asks Jacob to tell Georgiana that he will be gone for a while but he will return to her. When his relationship with Georgiana becomes serious, he goes to Maude to stop their affair. Maude also wants to stop as she is now engaged to Senator Phipps Ogden. Hoping that Maude could do him a favour, Marco travels to Long Island, in the hope that Maude and the senator will help solve his problem.

Jacob meanwhile, has become a successful Broadway writer, after convincing Abe Shulman to give him a chance. Nellie Byfield, a rising star on Broadway, uses Jacob's feelings towards her to marry him, even having a child with him in order to further her career.

Bridget, met Doctor Travers one day and apologises to him for the way that she spoke to him on Ellis Island. She says that her sister is now blind, as he diagnosed. He accepts her apology and after learning that she is a competent with a typewriter, offers her a job as his secretary on Ellis Island as he is now chief doctor there.

Georgiana spends her time working at the New York Library for the Blind. She learns one day that Marco become engaged to Vanessa Ogden, the daughter of Senator Ogden.

Marco hated himself for the way he treated Georgiana, but he decided that marrying Vanessa would be his ticket to high society. Senator Ogden approved of the engagement as he thought it might "tame" her. When they do get married, Marco makes regular trips to New York to see Georgiana, even though she senses that someone is watching her, Marco never tries to approach her. Marco and Vanessa's marriage produces a son, Frank. However, Vanessa refuses to sleep with Marco anymore. When Marco asks his father-in-law for his approval to run for the state senate, he agrees and thinks an Ellis Island immigrant would be the perfect candidate to go up against the Irish incumbent backed by Casey O'Donnell. When Vanessa makes an exhibition of herself at a party due to an alcohol problem, she is admitted to a hospital in Rhode Island, where she is befriended by an artist called Una Marbury.

After the death of a miner, Tom Banicek attempts to organise all of his colleagues against the working conditions at the Staunton Mining Company. The owner Monty Staunton, refuses to listen and fires Tom immediately. Tom goes to Pennsylvania to talk to union management about getting union representatives in the mines. They explain that it could take a long time but they will eventually.

When Jacob and Nellie's daughter dies, she reveals that she only married him for what he could do for her career. She also refuses to grant him a divorce even though she knows he is seeing another woman, Rebecca Weiler. When Jacob writes a play that a producer wants to make, Jacob says that the star of the show needs to be Flora Mitchum, the African American girlfriend of Roscoe Haines. The producer reluctantly agrees, and Jacob tells him that he can own 100% of the show if he agrees to cast Nellie in one of his Hollywood productions. When Nellie finds out about this, she grants Jacob a divorce as she wants to be in Hollywood pictures. Jacob marries Rebecca immediately.

When Una and Vanessa leave the hospital they spend a lot of time together, eventually becoming lovers. When Senator Ogden arranges to pay Una $50,000 to leave his daughter and stop a scandal in his family, Vanessa kills Una and then commits suicide. Marco decides to go and see Georgiana after some reluctance she admits she still loves him and they marry. Marco is soon elected as the first Ellis Island immigrant on the New York State Senate.

Meanwhile, Bridget has married Doctor Travers. One day at work she sees Denny Flynn a former colleague of hers at Wexford Hall. She fears that Denny will tell the authorities who she is and claim the reward money that the British Government is offering for information about the murder of Earl Wexford. Georgiana however, tells her that Marco can sort it and that he won't be deported or face any charges.

References

1983 American novels
Ellis Island
American historical novels
Novels by Fred Mustard Stewart
Novels set in the 1890s
Novels set in the 1900s
Novels set in the 1910s
Novels set in New York City